Roving sailor most commonly refers to:
Maurandya antirrhiniflora, a flowering plant of the genus Maurandya also known as climbing snapdragon or Maurandella antirrhiniflora

Roving sailor can also refer to other plants including:
Saxifraga stolonifera, a perennial flowering plant native to Asia
Cymbalaria muralis, a flowering plant native to Mediterranean Europe called "roving sailor" on the Isle of Wight